Parbuckle salvage, or parbuckling, is the righting of a sunken vessel using rotational leverage. A common operation with smaller watercraft, parbuckling is also employed to right large vessels.

Mechanical advantage and difficulties

While the mechanical advantage used by a laborer to parbuckle a cask up an incline is 2:1, parbuckling salvage is not so limited.  Each of the 21 winches used to roll the Oklahoma used cables that passed through two 17-part tackle assemblies (17:1 advantage).  Eight  diameter sheaves, eight  diameter sheaves, and one  diameter sheave comprised just half the mechanical effort.

A major concern during salvage is preventing rotational torque from becoming a transverse force moving the ship sideways.  , lost like the Oklahoma in the Pearl Harbor attack, was meant to be recovered by a similar rotation after the Oklahoma.  As the Utah was rotated, however, its hull did not catch on the harbor bottom, and the vessel slid toward Ford Island.  The Utah recovery effort was abandoned.

Righting of Oklahoma
Twenty-one electric winches were installed on Ford Island, anchored in concrete foundations. They operated in unison.

Oil had been removed from the ship through the bottom. The ship was lightened by air inside the hull. There was a large amount of weight in the ship which may have been removed prior to righting, but not all could be accessed. About one-third of the ammunition was taken off together with some of the machinery. The blades of the two propellers were also taken off, but more to avoid damage to them than to reduce weight.

Tests were made to check whether restraining forces should be used to prevent sliding toward Ford Island. It was indicated that the soil under the aft part of the ship prevented sliding, whereas the bow section rested in soupy mud which permitted it. To prevent sliding, about 2200 tons of coral soil were deposited near the bow section. During righting, excess soil under the starboard side was washed away by high-pressure jets operated by divers.

The ship rolled as it should have and was right-side up by 16 June 1943, the work having started 8 March 1943. The mean draft of the ship after righting was c. .

Righting of Costa Concordia

Following its capsizing and sinking in January 2012, the hull of Costa Concordia lay starboard side to the seaward face of a small outcropping very near the mouth of the harbor of Giglio, Italy, resting precariously on the incline to deeper water.  To right the vessel, four key pieces of apparatus were required:
 a "holdback" system of chains attached to the island on one end and the hull on the other to ensure Costa Concordia rolled in place;
 a man-made ledge inserted into the island face to provide a landing surface for the vessel;
 a series of sponsons attached to the hull's port side so as, when flooded, to increase the torque on the hull and to unburden the strand jacks;
 an arrangement of cables rising from the edge of the ledge over the sponsons on the port side of the hull.
Tensioning the cables started the roll of the ship.  At about the halfway-to-vertical position the sponsons were filled with seawater, and Costa Concordia completed its roll to upright upon the ledge.  The hull was rotated 65 degrees to become vertical.

Parbuckling was accomplished in three phases:
Freeing the hull
Phase of rotation using cables
Rotation by ballasting with sponsons

Holdback system
The holdback system consisted of 56 chains in total, of which 22 chains were attached to the port side to go under the hull to the island.

Ledge
The ledge was part steel and part grout. There were six steel platforms. The three larger platforms measured  each; the three smaller platforms measured  each. The grout filled the space between the land side of the platforms and the sea bed. The grout bags contained an "ecofriendly cement," and were built with eyelets to aid post-recovery cleanup.

Sponsons
Eleven steel sponsons were installed on the port side of the hull: two long horizontal sponsons; two long vertical sponsons and seven short vertical sponsons.
Each long horizontal sponson
measured ,
provided  of buoyancy.
Each long vertical sponson
measured ,
Each short vertical sponson
measured ,
Two steel "blister" tanks were connected together at the hull's bow.

Cables

Phase 1 – freeing the hull
The hull of Costa Concordia rested on two spurs of rock, and was severely deformed from the weight of the ship pressing down on the spurs. This phase began when the strand jacks exerted force and the ship started to return to an upright position. This was "without doubt one of the most delicate phases of the entire recovery plan."

Phase 2 – rotation using cables
This phase began when the hull lifted from the seabed. Rotation continued by tensioning the cables operated by the strand jacks, and continued until the sponson water intakes reached sea level.

Phase 3 – rotation by ballasting with sponsons
The hull continued to rotate, pulled down by the weight of seawater added to the sponsons. The strand jacks and cables went slack. Redundant systems were designed as a guard against failure.  For example, two seawater inlet valves were provided to each sponson.

List of parbuckle-salvaged vessels

MS Herald of Free Enterprise

MV Janra
MV Repubblica di Genova
MSC Napoli's separated stern section
Barge Larvik Rock 
Fishing trawler Nieuwpoort 28
Fishing vessel Sandy Point
MS Costa Concordia
Jackup work barge Sep Orion

References

External links

Pearl Harbor Raid, 7 December 1941 Salvage of USS Oklahoma, 1942–44
Salvage of the battleship USS Oklahoma following the attack on Pearl Harbor 1942–46
The Parbuckling Project: Concordia wreck removal project informative website

German website with a time-lapse video of the parbuckling of the Costa Concordia.

Marine engineering
Marine salvage
Rotation